Dominic Peter Michael (born 8 October 1987) is a Samoan-Australian cricketer. He has played international cricket for Samoa, and Australian domestic cricket for Tasmania and Queensland. He has also represented two Big Bash League franchises, the Brisbane Heat and the Hobart Hurricanes.

Early life
Michael was born in Brisbane to a Greek Cypriot father and a Samoan mother.

Domestic career
After appearances at under-19 and Futures League level, he made his senior debut for Queensland late in the 2012–13 season, playing two Sheffield Shield fixtures and one Ryobi One-Day Cup game. The holder of an EU passport through his father, Michael signed as the Netherlands' overseas player for the 2013 Yorkshire Bank 40 tournament, an English domestic competition. He finished as the second leading runscorer for the Netherlands, behind Wesley Barresi, and also found time to play three Second XI Championship matches for Kent.

Michael signed with the Brisbane Heat for the 2013–14 season, but his only match for the team came at the 2013 Champions League Twenty20 event in India, in which he scored a duck. He added another three Sheffield Shield matches for Queensland, but for the following season moved to Tasmania. Michael once again played only a single match for the state BBL franchise, the Hobart Hurricanes, but had more success in his Shield appearances for Tasmania. Against South Australia, he scored a maiden first-class half-century, 97 from 215 balls opening with Ed Cowan, which was followed by 52 against Victoria two matches later.

International career
In August 2018, he was named in Samoa's squad for Group A of the 2018–19 ICC World Twenty20 East Asia-Pacific Qualifier tournament. In the final match of the tournament, against Fiji, he scored 100 not out from 62 balls, and was named the man of the match. He finished the tournament as the leading run-scorer for Samoa, with 225 runs in six matches.

In June 2019, he was selected to represent the Samoa cricket team in the men's tournament at the 2019 Pacific Games. He made his Twenty20 International (T20I) debut for Samoa, against Papua New Guinea, on 8 July 2019.

References

External links
Player profile and statistics at CricketArchive
Player profile and statistics at ESPNcricinfo

1987 births
Living people
Australian cricketers
Samoan cricketers
Samoa Twenty20 International cricketers
Australian people of Greek Cypriot descent
Australian sportspeople of Samoan descent
Brisbane Heat cricketers
Cricketers from Brisbane
Hobart Hurricanes cricketers
Netherlands cricketers
Queensland cricketers
Tasmania cricketers